David John Pinner (born 6 October 1940 in Peterborough, England) is a British actor and novelist. He was  trained at the Royal Academy of Dramatic Art.  He has appeared on stage and television in many roles.

As an actor, he is known for Emergency Ward 10 (1962),  Z Cars (1967), The Growing Pains of PC Penrose (1975), (1985), Henry V (1979), The Prince Regent (1979) and Agatha Christie's Miss Marple: A Murder Is Announced.

His 1967 novel Ritual was a major inspiration for Anthony Shaffer's film The Wicker Man (1973). In 2014 he published The Wicca Woman, a sequel to Ritual.

Novels 

 Ritual (1967) Hutchinson/Arrow
 With My Body (1969) Weidenfeld & Nicolson/Corgi
 There'll Always Be An England (1985) Anthony Blond
 Ritual (2011) Finderskeepers
 Ritual (2014) ebook Endeavour Press
 The Wicca Woman (2014) ebook Endeavour Press

Stage Plays Performed

 Dickon (1966)Queens's Theatre, Hornchuch
 Fanghorn (1967) Traverse Theatre, Edinburgh
 Fanghorn (1968) Fortune Theatre, London with Glenda Jackson
 The Drums of Snow (1969) Stanford Repertory Theatre, California
 Lightning At A Funeral (1970) Stanford Repertory Theatre
 Marriages (1972) L.A.M.DA, London
 Cartoon (1973)Soho Poly, London
 Hereward the Wake (1974) Key Theatre, Peterborough
 Richelieu (1976) BBC 
 Lucifer's Fair (1976) Arts Theatre, London
 Shakebag (1976) Soho Poly, London
 Talleyrand, Prince of Traitors (1978) BBC
 An Evening With The G.L.C (1979) Soho Poly, London
 The Potsdam Quartet (1980) Lyric Theatre, Hammersmith + BBC
 Screwball (1982) Theatre Royal, Plymouth
 The Potsdam Quartet (1982) Lion Theatre, New York
 Revelations (1986) Grinnell, Iowa, USA
 The Teddy Bears' Picnic (1988)Gateway Theatre, Chester
 Skin Deep (1989) Gateway Theatre, Chester
 The Last Englishman (1990) Orange Tree Theatre, Richmond
 The Sins of the Mother (1996) Grace Theatre, London
 Lenin in Love (2000) New End Theatre, Hampstead, London
 All Hallows' Eve (2002) Hong Kong Academy of Performing Arts
 Midsummer (2003) Brehmer Theatre, Hamilton, New York
 Oh, To Be In England (2011) Finborough Theatre, London
 The Potsdam Quartet (2013) Jermyn Street Theatre, London
 Edred, the Vampyre  (2019) The Old Red Lion, London

Stage Plays Published

 Fanghorn (1966) Penguin Modern Playwrights 2
 Dickon (1967) Penguin Plays, New English Dramatists 10
 Drums of Snow (1968) Penguin Plays, New English Dramatists 13
 Drums of Snow (1972) Plays of the Year, Paul Elek Books Ltd
 The Potsdam Quartet (1980) Terra Nova Editions
 The Potsdam Quartet (1982) Samuel French
 Lenin In Love (2000) Oberon Books
 Two Plays; The Teddy Bears' Picnic/The Potsdam Quartet (2002) Oberon Modern Playwrights
 Midsummer/All Hallows' Eve (2002) Oberon Modern Plays
 Newton's Hooke (2003) Imperial College Press
 The Stalin Trilogy; Lenin In Love/The Teddy Bears' Picnic/The Potsdam Quartet (2003) Oberon Modern Playwrights
 Lady Day/Revelations (2003) Oberon Modern Plays
 Three Power Plays; The Drums of Snow/Richelieu/Prince of Traitors (2006) Oberon Modern Playwrights
 Oh, To Be In England (2011) Oberon Modern Playwrights
 The Vampire Trilogy; Fanghorn/Edred, the Vampyre/Lucifer's Fair (2011) Oberon Modern Playwrights
 The Joy of Misery; four one-act plays; Cartoon/An Evening With The G.L.C/Shakebag/Succubus (2012) Oberon Modern Playwrights

References

External links
 

1940 births
Living people
English male stage actors
English male television actors
20th-century English novelists
21st-century English novelists
English dramatists and playwrights
People from Peterborough
Alumni of RADA
20th-century English male actors
21st-century English male actors
Male actors from Cambridgeshire
English male dramatists and playwrights
English male novelists
20th-century English male writers
21st-century English male writers